A Maqām is a shrine built on the site associated with a religious figure or saint, typical to the regions of Palestine and Syria. It is usually a funeral construction, commonly cubic-shaped and topped with a dome.

Maqams are associated with Muslim traditions, but many of them are rooted in ancient Semitic, Jewish, Samaritan and Christian traditions. During the 19th century, Claude Reignier Conder described maqams as an essential part of folk religion in Palestine, with locals attaching "more importance to the favour and protection of the village Mukam than to Allah himself, or to Mohammed his prophet". The maqams of Palestine were considered highly significant to the field of biblical archaeology, as their names were used in the 18th and 19th centuries to identify much of biblical geography.

Etymology 
From Arabic literally "a place" or "station." It is used to denote a "sanctuary", such as a commemorative burial shrine or an actual tomb. Its meaning can be restricted only to built structures that can be entered at such sites. The literal meaning of maqam is "the place where one stands." Such name for a holy tomb is mostly used in Syria and Palestine.

The form Mukam appears in the essays of European travelers of the 19th century; as well as words Waly, Wely ( – tomb of a saint), Mazar (mausoleum), Mashhad.

In Maghreb similar tombs are known as Marabout, in Turkic-speaking Muslim countries as Türbe, Dürbe, Aziz and in Iranian-speaking countries – Dargah.

Purpose 
Maqams were dedicated to Biblical and Quranic, real or mythical, male and female figures from ancient times to the time of the Arab conquest or even late Ottoman rule. Ali Qleibo, a Palestinian anthropologist, states that this built evidence constitutes "an architectural testimony to Christian/Moslem Palestinian religious sensibility and its roots in ancient Semitic religions." In 1877, the British explorer Claude Reignier Conder wrote that:

Almost every village in Palestine has a wali, a patron saint, whom people, predominantly rural peasants, would call upon for help at his or her associated sanctuary. While wali can refer to both the saint and sanctuary, a sanctuary for a common saint is more precisely known as a maqam.

Construction 
The most popular type of maqams is a single chamber square building topped with a dome, in the middle of which there is a stone cenotaph, though the bodies of the revered figures themselves were buried below the ground level. In the south wall of the maqam, there is usually a small mihrab facing Mecca, decorated with inscriptions and floral ornament. The entrance to the chamber is mostly at the north wall. In the other arched walls there are usually small windows. Candelabras and lamps are hanging in an active maqam, a cenotaph is covered by a quilt (usually a green one), praying rugs are spread on the floor in front of the mihrab.

There are also bigger maqams, consisting of two, three or four chambers: prayer chamber, entrance hall, zawiya or a room for pilgrims to have a rest. Big maqams have two or three similar domes. In times of old, the dome was decorated by a metal spire with a crescent, but nowadays such decoration is rare.

The maqams are not always supposed to stand over the tombs of the saints to whom they are dedicated. A cenotaph is indeed almost always to be found there, but often they are regarded merely as "stations."
The dome is often situated by an ancient carob or oak tree or a spring or rock cut water cistern. A sacred tree was planted near maqams, mostly – a palm tree, oak or sycomore. There was also a well or spring. The positioning of maqams on or near these natural features is seen as indicative of ancient worship practices adapted by the local population and associated with religious figures.

As a rule, maqams were built on the top of the hills or at the crossroads, and besides their main function – shrine and prayer place, they also served as a guard point and a guiding landmark for travelers and caravans. Over the years, new burial places appeared near maqams; it was considered as honour to be buried next to a saint. Big cemeteries formed around many Muslim sanctuaries.

History

Early origins 

According to Claude Reignier Conder, many maqams are originated in Jewish and Christian traditions from before the advent of Islam in the region. He identified seven types of maqams:
 Biblical characters: "These are, no doubt, generally the oldest, and can often be traced back to Jewish tradition"
 Christian sites venerated by the Moslem peasantry: "not always distinguishable from the first class, but often traceable to the teaching of the monasteries or to monkish sites"
 Other native heroes or deities: "perhaps sometimes the most ancient sites of all"
 Later and known historic characters
 Saints named from the place where they occur, or having appellations connected with traditions concerning them
 Sacred sites not connected with personal names: "Some of these are of the greatest value"
 Ordinary Moslem names which may be of any date

Middle ages 

In the seventh century, the Arab Rashiduns conquered the Levant; they were later succeeded by other Arabic-speaking Muslim dynasties, including the Umayyads, Abbasids and the Fatimids. Early Islam disapproved worshipping of holy men and their burial places, considering it a sort of idolatry. However, the Shiites built sumptuous tombs for their deceased leaders – imams and sheikhs, and turned those tombs into religious objects. Very soon Sunnis followed their example. Arab travellers and geographers ‘Ali al-Harawi, Yaqut al-Hamawi and others described in their essays many Christian and Muslim shrines in Syria, Palestine and Egypt.

During the times of Mamluk dynasty, monumental tombs were built for Muslim holy men, scientists and theologists, some of these tombs have come down to present times. The major part of them is located in Egypt, and some parts are also in Syria and Palestine. These are namely the famous Rachel's Tomb in Bethlehem (though the burial place of matriarch Rachel was worshipped even before), the splendid mausoleum of Abu Hurairah in Yavne and the maqam of sheikh Abu ‘Atabi in Al-Manshiyya, Acre.

Ottoman period 
In the Ottoman Empire times, maqams were constructed everywhere, and old sanctuaries were taken under restoration. New buildings were not as monumental and pompous as before, and looked quite unpretentious. In Turkish period, maqams had simple construction and almost no architectural décor.

Mosques were uncommon in Palestinian villages until the late 19th century, but practically every village had at least one maqam which served as sites of worship in the Palestinian folk Islam popular in the countryside over the centuries. Christians and Jews also held some of the maqams to be holy, such as that of Nabi Samwil. In the period of Ottoman rule over Palestine, most of these sites were visited collectively by members of all three faiths who often travelled together with provisions for a multi-day journey; by the Mandate Palestine period, politicization led to segregation. Some maqams, like Nabi Rubin and Nabi Musa among others, were also the focus of seasonal festivals (mawsims) that thousands would attend annually.

Modern era 
The period of Mandatory Palestine has become the last time of maqams' prosperity. Dilapidated Muslims shrines were restored and also new ones built. The British built over and donated to Bedouins the Maqam of sheikh Nuran, which was damaged during the Sinai and Palestine Campaign. This maqam was in the battle epicenter during the 1948 Arab–Israeli War. After having captured it, Israeli soldiers turned it into a watch and firing point. Since that time the maqam of sheikh Nuran is a memorial of the Israel Defense Forces.

After the State of Israel was formed, numerous shrines were turned into Jewish religious shrines. It concerned the mausoleum of sheikh Abu Hurairah, it which has become the tomb of Rabban Gamaliel II in Yavne; the Maqam with seven domes of Imam ‘Ali in Yazur has turned into a synagogue in Azor; the mazar of Sitt Sakina (Sukeyna) has become Rachel's tomb, the spouse of Rabbi Akiva in Tiberias; the Maqam of sheikh al-Gharbawi – the tomb of Mattathias; the muqam of Nabi Sheman near the Junction Eyal, was identified with the tomb of Simeon (son of Jacob).

In ancient times, all maqams with the domes were coloured in white. Recently Palestinian and Israeli Arabs got used to colour the domes of their shrines in green (the colour of Islam). The battle for one or another shrine resulted in the war of colours, as it was called in press. Religious Jewish paint the dome in blue or white and install Jewish symbols, and Muslims, when coming back, remove Jewish symbols and paint the dome in green.

Notable Maqams 

No more than 300 maqams have survived out of 800 existing in Palestine in 1948, the remainder having been demolished. Half of them are in Israel-proper, the remainder in the West Bank and Gaza Strip, both of which have been under Israeli control for most of the period since 1948. According to another source, the number of Palestinian maqams left is 184, with only 70 remaining in Israel-proper.

See also

References

Citations

Sources

 
 
 
  
 Frantzman, S.J. and Bar, D. (2013) Mapping Muslim Sacred Tombs in Palestine During the Mandate Period. // "Levant", 2013, Vol. 45, No 1. P. 96–111.

External links

 Interactive map of Palestinian maqams
 Muslim shrines in Israel. Guide

Burial monuments and structures
Mausoleums